Valens was a Roman emperor (364–378).

Valens may also refer to:
Valens (usurper), probably Iulius Valens Licinianus, usurper (250) under emperor Decius 
Valerius Valens, Roman emperor (316–317) co-emperor of Licinius
Valens, Ontario, a hamlet within Hamilton, Ontario, Canada
Valens, Switzerland, a resort in the canton of St. Gallen
Valens Semiconductor, an Israeli semiconductor company producing chips for the HDBaseT video standard
Valens, a protagonist in Gladius

People with the name
Fabius Valens, Roman general under Emperor Nero (died 69)
Vettius Valens, astrologer (died c. 175)
Valens Thessalonicus, usurper under Emperor Gallienus (261)
Valens of Mursa (4th century AD), was bishop of Mursa (Osijek in modern Croatia) and a supporter of Homoian (semi-arianism) theology
Valens Acidalius (1567–1595), was a German critic and poet
Valens Comyn (1688–1751), was an English merchant and administrator and politician
Ritchie Valens (1941–1959), American rock music pioneer
Chloe Valens, a character in Tales of Legendia

See also
 Vale (disambiguation)
 Valen (disambiguation)